Fattaneh Haj Seyed Javadi (also Romanized as “Fattāne(h) Hāj-Seyyed-Javādī”; born 1945) is a best selling Iranian novelist.

Born in Kazerun, Seyed Javadi studied in Tehran and Isfahan, after which she taught for many years. At the beginning of the 1990s she translated Jeffrey Archer's Kane and Abel. Her first novel, The Morning of the Hangover published in German as Der Morgen der Trunkenheit was a bestseller in Iran for four years running and was in its 29th printing in 2002. She went on to write a collection of short stories: In der Abgeschiedenheit des Schlafs (In the Lonesomeness of Sleep).

The Morning of the Hangover tells the story of an aristocratic woman who marries a carpenter to defy her family and its publication was a turning point for women writers. Strict rules imposed after the 1979 Revolution funneled expression which was unacceptable in public life into fictional characters. Javadi's The Morning of the Hangover contended that social themes could be explored even within the bounds of censorship.

The English edition of the book is published under the title of The Morning After by Firouz Media in 2022.

Selected works
   (1998) (in Persian)
 Der Morgen der Trunkenheit (2000) (in German)
 (2001) (in Persian) 
In der Abgeschiedenheit des Schlafs: Erzählungen (2004) (in German)

References

Iranian women novelists
Iranian novelists
20th-century Iranian women writers
Living people
21st-century Iranian women writers
1945 births
People from Kazerun